Yuri González Vidal (born 12 January 1981) is a Cuban chess player. He received the FIDE title of Grandmaster (GM) in November 2008. González Vidal competed in the FIDE World Cup in 2017. In team events, he has represented Cuba in the Chess Olympiad in 2014 and the World Team Chess Championship in 2015.

References

External links 
 
 
 
 

1981 births
Living people
Cuban chess players
Chess grandmasters
Chess Olympiad competitors
People from Havana